The Illes Medes is a small and craggy group of seven islets in the Costa Brava area of the northwestern Mediterranean Sea. Administratively, the Medes Archipelago belongs to the Baix Empordà comarca, Catalonia, Spain. The islands are protected as a nature reserve;  scubadiving is popular but is thus regulated there and requires permission.

The islands are located close to the shore, east of the coastal town of L'Estartit.

Islands
It has some Mediterranean vegetation and a 19th-century lighthouse on it. The lighthouse was built on La Meda Gran in 1866; it had a resident lighthouse keeper until 1932 when the installation of an automatic light made him redundant. Currently the island has a solar-powered automatic lighthouse.
Meda Xica, the second largest island, has a total surface of only .
Carall (or Cavall) Bernat, Tascons Grossos, Medellot, Tascons Petits and Ferrenelles are mere steep rocky outcrops jutting out from the sea.

History
In the 15th century the Equestrian Order of the Holy Sepulchre of Jerusalem built a fortress on Meda Gran. They eventually left and pirate attacks in the 16th century damaged the fortress. The fortress became a prison during the 18th century and at the time of the Napoleonic Wars was again fortified.

On 29 August 1811 General Joaquín Ibáñez Cuevas y de Valonga, Baron de Eroles, at the behest of Luis Roberto de Lacy and with the assistance of HMS Cambrian, a Colonel Green, and British troops, landed, captured, and destroyed the fort the French had built on Meda Gran. Green then ordered the fort abandoned. Several weeks later, on 11 September, de Lacy landed on the island. He rebuilt, garrisoned and fortified the fort, and symbolically renamed the islands the Isles of the Restoration. The last military garrison left in 1890.

Ecology
The Catalan Autonomous Government declared the islands a protected area in 1983. They are now becoming an important marine reserve in the Western Mediterranean.

Despite the ravages caused by industrial pollution and mass-tourism in the Mediterranean coast of the Iberian Peninsula, there is still a significant amount of marine biodiversity in the waters off the islands, such as large submarine meadows of Posidonia oceanica, and underwater caves where groupers breed.

See also
Costa Brava

References

External links 

Illes Medes - Tourism

Seabird colonies
Marine reserves of Spain
Islands of Spain
Landforms of Catalonia